Lehman Brothers Treasury Co. B.V. ("LBT") was a private company with limited liability (besloten vennootschap met beperkte aansprakelijkheid) incorporated under Dutch law with its registered office in Amsterdam, the Netherlands. LBT was a fully owned subsidiary of Lehman Brothers UK Holdings (Delaware) Inc., which company was fully owned by Lehman Brothers Holdings Inc. ("LBH"). On 15 September 2008 LBH filed a petition in the United States Bankruptcy Court for the Southern District of New York seeking relief under Chapter 11 of the United States Bankruptcy Code.

On 19 September 2008 the Amsterdam District Court granted LBT provisional suspension of payment (voorlopige surseance van betaling). On 8 October 2008 at 18.56 hours the Amsterdam District Court revoked the provisional suspension of payment and declared LBT bankrupt (in staat van faillissement) with the appointment of Rutger Schimmelpenninck as bankruptcy trustee (curator). Source: The official website of the bankruptcy trustee.

External links
 Official website of the bankruptcy trustee with updates on the equities of Lehman Brothers Treasury

Lehman Brothers
Companies that filed for Chapter 11 bankruptcy in 2008
Financial services companies of the Netherlands
Insolvent companies of the Netherlands
Companies based in Amsterdam